Bristol Paint is an Australian decorating supplies company. It has 120 stores throughout the country, which employs 500 staff. Bristol Paints was created by S. G. White and J. A. Bate in November 1947.

References

External links

Paint and coatings companies of Australia
Manufacturing companies based in Melbourne